National Council for Science and Technology is a national council of Bangladesh government responsible for developing policies concerning science and technology. It develops and manages science and technology research facilities. It is headed by Prime Minister Sheikh Hasina.

History
National Council for Science and Technology was established on 16 May 1983 as the National Committee for Science and Technology. The council is headed by the head of the government, Prime Minister of Bangladesh. It is managed by the Executive Committee of the National Council for Science and Technology.

See also
Manasse Mbonye

References

1983 establishments in Bangladesh
Organisations based in Dhaka
Government agencies of Bangladesh